Cahokia Township (T8N R6W) is located in Macoupin County, Illinois, United States. As of the 2010 census, its population was 3,378 and it contained 1,594 housing units.

Geography

Demographics

Adjacent townships
 Honey Point Township (north)
 North Litchfield Township, Montgomery County (northeast)
 South Litchfield Township, Montgomery County (east)
 Walshville Township, Montgomery County (southeast)
 Mount Olive Township (south)
 Dorchester Township (southwest)
 Gillespie Township (west)
 Brushy Mound Township (northwest)

References

External links
City-data.com
Illinois State Archives

Townships in Macoupin County, Illinois
Townships in Illinois